James Sproull Cothran (August 8, 1830 – December 5, 1897) was elected to the U.S. House of Representatives for South Carolina's 3rd congressional district. He served for two terms from 1887 to 1891.

Biography

James Sproull Cothran was born in Abbeville County, South Carolina on August 8, 1830. He attended the country schools and graduated from the University of Georgia in  Athens in 1852. He was an attorney in  private practice. He served with the Confederate Army. He was solicitor of the eighth judicial circuit of South Carolina in 1876 and 1880 and judge of the eighth judicial circuit of South Carolina from 1881 to 1886. He was elected as a Democrat to the Fiftieth and to the succeeding Congress (March 4, 1887 – March 3, 1891). Cothran  was not a candidate for renomination to the Fifty-second Congress in 1890. He died on December 5, 1897, in New York, New York. He was interred in Upper Long Cane Cemetery, Abbeville, South Carolina.

External links
 Congressional biography

1830 births
1897 deaths
University of Georgia alumni
People from Abbeville County, South Carolina
Democratic Party members of the United States House of Representatives from South Carolina
19th-century American politicians